Margaret Ann Dix (born 19 May 1939) is a Jersey-born Guatemalan botanist.

Biography
Born on Jersey in the Channel Islands, she attended  London University where she graduated in biology in 1962. She received her masters in zoology from Mount Holyoke College, Massachchusetts, in 1964. From 1964 to 1968, she studied entomology, ecology and animal behaviour at Harvard University under E. O. Wilson. While studying at Harvard, she was required to spend two years abroad. At the end of 1972, together with her American husband, Michael W. Dix, she decided to go to Guatemala where there was an opportunity to found a biology department at the University of the Valley. In 1977, she was appointed director of the department, a post she maintained until 2002. She is still associated with biological and environmental research at the university and continues to be active in the field.

Dix is a recognized taxonomist, especially in the area of Guatemalan orchids. Her Orchids of Guatemala: A revised annotated checklist (2000) based on extensive field collections covers 734 taxa, including 207 new records.

Selected publications

Journal articles
 . 2007. Integrated approaches to orchid conservation in Guatemala: past, present and future, opportunities and challenges. Lankesteriana 7 (1–2): 266–268
 . 2006. Diversity, distribution, ecology and economic importance of Guatemalan orchids, pp. 187–198 in E. Cano (ed.) Biodiversidad de Guatemala. Volumen 1. Universidad del Valle
 . 2003. Rhynchostele bictoniensis: cambios en abundancia y éxito de polinización entre 1992 y 2002. Lankesteriana 3 (7 ): 98
 . 2003. Impacto de Hydrilla verticillata. Fase 1. Datos biológicos e indicadores básicos de ictiofauna en el lago de Izabal.  Informe final Proyecto AGROCYT
 . 2003. Polinización de orquídeas en Guatemala: los polinizadores, el estado natural de sus poblaciones y las implicaciones para las especies polinizadas. Lankesteriana 3 (7 ): 97
 . 2001. Conservation of orchids in Guatemala. Memoria 2º Seminario Mesoamericano de Orquidología y Conservación. p. 17
 . 2001. Relaciones genéticas e hibridación natural entre especies de Lycaste, Sección Deciduosae, sub-sección Xanthantae (Orch.) en Guatemala. Memoria Segundo Seminario Mesoamericana de Orquídeología. p. 26.
 . 1999. El impacto del huracán Mitch sobre la integridad ecológica del lago de Izabal y sus afluentes.  Mesoamericana 4 (3): 114

Books

References

Guatemalan botanists
Orchidologists
Taxonomists
1939 births
Living people
Jersey people
Women botanists
Women taxonomists
British emigrants to Guatemala
Alumni of the University of London
Mount Holyoke College alumni
Harvard University alumni
20th-century British scientists
20th-century botanists
20th-century British women scientists
20th-century Guatemalan women writers
20th-century non-fiction writers
Guatemalan women scientists